United Services Portsmouth RFC is now 140 years old and once featured amongst the top clubs of English rugby.  With a proud history and boasting of many former international, county and inter-service players. Currently re-building from the difficulties of covid-19.

History
It is believed that United Services Portsmouth RFC was founded in 1882, there being records of the club from that date With the exception of the 1884-5 season and the War Years, the club has unbroken records of fixtures. At the beginning of the twentieth century the club found it hard to gain support from service players, because it was considered necessary to turn out for civilian clubs to get first-class games. However, in 1902 the United Services Recreation Ground began to give financial support to the club to stimulate interest and by the time a Royal Navy Rugby Union was formed in 1906 the club was performing strongly with an excellent reputation and equally strong fixture list. It was described by Wavell Wakefield in the 1930s as one of the strongest clubs in the country. This dominance was helped in no small part by the continued sponsorship of the Royal Navy. Until the start of league rugby. the fixture list boasted the elite of domestic football (including Bath, Leicester, Harlequins, and Saracens)

">Official site - History</ref>

In the professional era, the club no longer features as a first-class side. The early twenty-first century saw the club fielding three squads, The Bulldogs, Buccaneers & Crusaders. In order to shore up numbers the club is also open to civilians to join. This results in a club that boasts a combination of players from the Royal Navy, Army, Air Force, local Civilians and the Students from Portsmouth University.

The first squad, the United Service Portsmouth Bulldogs, compete in London 3 South West and play at the Burnaby Road ground. In the season 2014/15 the club won the Hampshire 1 League with an unprecedented 18 wins out of 18 and gained 18 try bonus points. The club is still backed by the Royal Navy Rugby Union.

Notable players
International players include:
 - W N Lapage
 - Fischer Burges-Watson
 - George Hamilton D'Oyly Lyon
 - John Skinner Wilson
 - Louis Greig
 - H C Harrison
 - A D Warrington-Morris
 - A C Bolton
 - Norman Wodehouse
 - W E Mann
 - Cecil Abercrombie
 - W B Hynes
 - A H MacIlwaine
 - J L Boyd
 - Francis Oakeley
 - W. J. A. Davies
 - A L Harrison
 - Cecil Kershaw
 - C F Hallaran
 - Cecil MacKenzie
 - A E Thomson
 - P B William-Powlett
 - M S Bradby
 - H W V Stephenson
 - W F Browne

Club Honours
Hampshire Cup winners (6): 1971, 1972, 1977, 1981, 1982, 1983
Hampshire 1 champions (3): 1999–00, 2014–15, 2017–18
Hampshire Plate winners: 2009

See also
United Services Devonport Rugby Football Club

References

External links
Official Website of United Services RFC

English rugby union teams
Rugby clubs established in 1882
Rugby union clubs in Hampshire
Sport in Portsmouth
Military sport in the United Kingdom
1882 establishments in England